The 1986–87 Soviet Championship League season was the 41st season of the Soviet Championship League, the top level of ice hockey in the Soviet Union. 12 teams participated in the league, and CSKA Moscow won the championship.

First round

Final round

Relegation

Promotion and relegation

Relegation games 
 Awtomobilist Sverdlovsk − Traktor Chelyabinsk 2:2, 3:2, 4:2, 4:4
 Torpedo Ust-Kamenogorsk − Sokol Kiev 4:5, 5:11, 5:13

External links
Season on hockeystars.ru

1986–87 in Soviet ice hockey
Sov
Soviet League seasons